Elena Pirrone (born 21 February 1999) is an Italian racing cyclist, who currently rides for UCI Women's World Tour Team Israel Premier Tech Roland. At the 2017 UCI Road World Championships, Pirrone won both the women's junior road race and the women's junior time trial events.

Major results
2016
10th Time trial, UCI Junior Road World Championships

2017
UCI Junior Road World Championships
1st  Road race
1st  Time trial
 1st  Time trial, UEC Junior European Championships
4th Coppa Sanremo in Fiore

2018
 1st Overall Giro della Campania in Rosa
1st Stage 2
2nd Trofeo Ernesto Cavalli

2021
 3rd  Time trial, UEC European Under–23 Road Championships

2022
 7th Tre Valli Varesine Women's Race

References

External links

1999 births
Living people
Italian female cyclists
Sportspeople from Bolzano
Cyclists from Trentino-Alto Adige/Südtirol